Zinc finger protein 37A is a protein that in humans is encoded by the ZNF37A gene.

References

Further reading